Lamu County is a county of Kenya located along the North Coast of the country and is one of the six Coastal Counties in Kenya. Its capital is the town of Lamu. It borders Tana River County to the southwest, Garissa County to the north, Somalia to the northeast, and the Indian Ocean to the South. 

As of the 2019 census, Lamu County had a population of 143,920, making it the least populated county in Kenya.

Demographics 

The county is made of a cosmopolitan population composed of communities such as Boni, Ormas, Swahilis, Arabs, Koreni, Kikuyu, and other 
migrant communities from the rest of the country. The county has a total population of 143,920 of which 76,103 are males 67,813 females and 4 intersex persons. There are 37,963 households with an average household size of 3.7 persons per household and a population density of 23 people per square kilometer.

The LAPSSET project is expected to attract a huge migrant population estimated to be over one million. This will certainly overstretch the county's social services necessitating commensurate development planning for adequate service provision.

Religion

Administrative and political units

Administrative units 

The county has 2 constituencies: Lamu West and Lamu East. These two also consist of the two districts referred to as the sub-counties in Lamu County. Lamu West has Amu Mkomani, Shela, Hindi, Mkunumbi, Hongwe, Bahari and Witu Divisions while Lamu East has Faza, Basuba and Kiunga divisions. There are 10 wards, 23 locations, and 38 sub-locations in the county.

Political units 

There are two constituencies and ten county assembly wards.

Constituencies 

 MP – Hon. Muthama, Stanley Muiruri Lamu West Constituency
 MP – Hon.Ruweida Mohammed Obo Lamu East Constituency

Source

Political leadership 

H.E. Issa Abdalla Timamy is the current Governor and is deputized by H.E. Raphael Munyua. H.E. Yasin Twaha was the second Governor and was deputized by H.E. Aboud Bwana Abdulhakim First elected governor for the county was Issa Timamy and was deputized by H.E. Eric Kinyua Mugo. Anuar Loitiptip was the second elected senator after Abu Chiaba.The current Senator is Hon. Joseph Githuka The current Women Representative is Monica Mūthoni Marubu Ruweida Mohamed Obo was the women representative and was elected in 2017, before her was Shakila Abdalla who was elected in 2013.

For Lamu County, the County Executive Committee comprises:-

Source

Education 

Lamu has 203 ECD centers, 139 primary schools and 25 secondary schools. There are also 58 adult training institutions, 6 vocational training centers as well as 3 universities.

Health 

There are a total of 45 health facilities in the county, as well as one county referral hospital. The county has 316 health personnel of different cadre.

HIV prevalence is at 3.5%, compared to the national 5.9%.

Transport and communication 

The county is covered by 923.07 km of road network. Of this, 718.66 km is covered by earth surface, 198.41 km is murram surface and 6 km is covered by bitumen.

There are five Post Offices with 1,250 installed letter boxes, 653 rented letter boxes and 597 vacant letter boxes.

Trade and commerce 

The main economic activities in the county include crop production, livestock production, fisheries, tourism and mining, most notably quarrying. Lamu is rich in minerals like titanium, salt, limestone, coral stones and sand. Lamu town is termed as "the oldest and best-preserved Swahili settlement in East Africa” but neighboring islands also have numerous archaeological remnants of history dating as far back as the 14th Century.

Among the challenges facing Lamu is population growth owing to migration into Lamu from other parts of the country, fueled partly by the anticipated opportunities accruing from the Lamu Port South Sudan-Ethiopia Transport (LAPSSET) Corridor. Other challenges include landlessness and poor land management, insufficient social services such as healthcare and education, inadequate supply of piped and fresh water, under-developed infrastructure, and food insecurity.

There are 9 trading centers, 606 registered businesses, 465 licensed retail traders, 7 supermarkets, 27 licensed wholesale traders and 98 registered hotels.

The county has two National reserves: Dodori, and Kiunga Marine, covering 877 km2. Dodori is a breeding ground for the East Lamu Topi, and consists of a variety of mammals and birdlife including lions, elephant shrew, hippo, pelicans, and many more. It has the most varied species of mangrove forest in Kenya at Dodori Creek. Kiunga Marine Reserve consists of several islands rich with biodiversity including valuable coral reefs, sea grass, extensive mangrove forests, and the endangered sea turtles and dugongs. Kiwayu Island, which is part of the reserve, is deemed as having the most pristine beach in Kenya.

Villages and settlements

See also 

 Tana River County
 Garissa County
 Mombasa County
 Kilifi County

References 

www.lamu.go.ke

External links 

 Office for the Coordination of Humanitarian Affairs – Kenya AdminLevels 1-4
 http://www.mambolook.com/lamu

 
Counties of Kenya